Daynile District is the largest district in the southeastern Banaadir region of Somalia. It includes the northern outskirts of the national capital, Mogadishu.

Journalist Robert Scahill writes that in early January 2003, and for some years before, Mohamed Afrah Qanyare controlled the Daynile airstrip, a few kilometres north of Mogadishu. His security force guarded its perimeter and land mines were laid in the 'bush' around it. Qanyare was wone of the most powerful warlords after the fall of Barre, and the airfield was used for importing khat into the country (Scahill, Dirty Wars, Nation Books, New York, 2013, 118). Eventually he helped the U.S. form the Alliance for the Restoration of Peace and Counter-Terrorism.

References

External links
Administrative map of Daynile District

Districts of Somalia
Banaadir